Hofheinz is a surname. Notable people with the surname include:

Fred Hofheinz (born 1938), American politician
Roy Hofheinz (1912–1982), American judge
Roy Hofheinz Jr. (born 1935), American academic and sinologist

See also
Margret Hofheinz-Döring (1910–1994), German painter and graphic artist
Hofheinz Pavilion, a basketball venue in Houston, Texas